John Ging (born 1965), an Irish national, was appointed as Director of the Operational Division at the UN Office for the Coordination of Humanitarian Affairs (OCHA) in New York in February 2011. He oversees the management of all OCHA field operations worldwide. On behalf of the Emergency Relief Coordinator, he is the day-to-day focal point for supporting Humanitarian Coordinators. Ging is also the lead adviser to the Under-Secretary-General for Humanitarian Affairs on operational decision-making.

Prior to joining OCHA, John Ging was the Director of UNRWA Operations in the Gaza Strip from 2006 until 2011.

Before joining UNRWA, Ging worked in a variety of missions in the Balkans, Africa and the Middle East. In the Balkans, he served as chief of staff of the Institution Building Pillar within the UN Mission in Kosovo (UNMIK). Prior to that, he worked for 8 years as chief of staff in the mission of the Organization for Security Cooperation in Europe (OSCE) in Bosnia and Herzegovina. During and after the Rwandan genocide (1994–1996), Ging served as regional field director with the Irish NGO GOAL. According to colleagues who worked with him at the time, he took on difficult jobs like arranging the mass burial of 40,000 refugees who died when cholera swept through their camp. In the period 1989–1994, Ging completed three tours of duty as a United Nations peacekeeper with UNIFIL in South Lebanon. He began his career in the Irish Defense Forces in 1983, where he served as a commissioned officer.

John Ging is a lawyer (Barrister-at-Law) by qualification. He is a double graduate of National University of Ireland, Galway (NUI Galway), holding a primary and a postgraduate degrees, having completed studies in Law, Sociology and Political Science.

Early life
Ging grew up in Co.Laois, Ireland. He attended secondary school at the Salesian College, Ballinakill.  In 1983, he joined the Irish Army, where he rose to the rank of captain.

Director of UNRWA Operations in Gaza

Ging took up his position as Director of UNRWA Operations in Gaza in February 2006. In the Gaza Strip, he managed over 11,000 staff and programmes with an annual budget in excess of US$450 million delivering education, health care, relief and social services, microcredit, infrastructure development and emergency assistance to more than 1 million Palestine refugees.

During his time in Gaza, there were two direct attempts on John Ging's life. In March 2007, his convoy was ambushed by masked gunmen. Ging escaped the attempt with more than a dozen bullets in the side of his car.

In the summer of 2007, Ging survived another attempt on his life launched by extremists in Rafah. The attack left one Palestinian dead and 7 wounded. He received renewed death threats in 2010.

The Gaza War (2008–09)
During the war on Gaza in December 2008 – January 2009, Ging rose to international prominence as a principled advocate for the rights of civilians caught in conflict. Speaking from Gaza, Ging repeatedly called for a halt to the military attacks, reminding the international community of their responsibilities to protect innocent civilians who had no safe shelter or refuge. At the time, 50,000 civilians fled from their homes and sought refuge in UNRWA schools to escape the hostilities. 
During the war, several United Nations installations came under fire from the Israeli Defense Forces (IDF). This included the main UNRWA compound in Gaza City. Ging suspended aid convoys when one of his staff was killed; operations were restored once a better co-ordination mechanism for aid convoys travelling through humanitarian corridors had been established for the remainder of the hostilities. A few weeks later, Ging suspended aid convoys again; this time in protest of Hamas having hijacked an UNRWA aid convoy. Hamas agreed to his demand that the stolen aid be returned and a pledge was given that there would be no recurrence.

Awards
Ging was awarded an honorary degree  by NUI Galway in 2019 for his lifelong commitment to humanitarism.

References

External links

 Official UNRWA homepage
 Friends of UNRWA Association

1965 births
Living people
Irish humanitarians
People from County Laois
Irish officials of the United Nations
UNRWA officials